The 1977 Soviet football championship was the 46th seasons of competitive football in the Soviet Union, the 40th among teams of masters. Dinamo Kiev won the Top League championship becoming the Soviet domestic champions for the eighth time.

Honours

Notes = Number in parentheses is the times that club has won that honour. * indicates new record for competition

Soviet Union football championship

Top League

First League

Second League (playoffs)

 [Oct 31, Nov 5]
 Spartak Semipalatinsk  2-2 0-3  SKA Odessa 
 Kuban Krasnodar        2-0 1-2  Yangiyer 
 Spartak Nalchik        1-0 0-1  Žalgiris Vilnius

Replay 
 [Nov 8]
 KUBAN Krasnodar        2-0  Yangiyer         [in Simferopol] 
 Žalgiris Vilnius       2-1  Spartak Nalchik  [in Kishinev]

Top goalscorers

Top League
 Oleh Blokhin (Dinamo Kiev) – 17 goals

First League
Ihor Nadeyin (Nistru Kishinev), Vitaliy Razdayev (Kuzbass Kemerovo), Anatoliy Zinchenko (Dinamo Leningrad) – 19 goals

References

External links
 1977 Soviet football championship. RSSSF